Saint-Julien-de-Concelles is a commune in the Loire-Atlantique department in western France.

Saint-Julien-de-Concelles is the home of the popular beurre blanc sauce. The sauce was first prepared in a small restaurant on the banks of the river Loire. The town is also one of France's main growers of the mâche (lambs lettuce). Its flat and sandy land is suited to growing vegetables, such as leeks, and some flowers. Saint-Julien-de-Concelles also grows the grapes on its hills that produce local Muscadet wine.

A large lake, known as the Plan d'Eau du Chêne, is located near to the center of Saint-Julien-de-Concelles. The lake supports sailing, fishing, various sports and attracts walkers and nature lovers.

Population

Gallery

See also
Communes of the Loire-Atlantique department

References

External links
 

Saintjuliendeconcelles